The Santa Marta antbird (Drymophila hellmayri) is a species of bird in the family Thamnophilidae. It is endemic to humid foothill forests of the Sierra Nevada de Santa Marta in Colombia, especially in association with bamboo. This 15 cm (6 in) bird is found at higher elevations. It was previously considered conspecific with the long-tailed antbird.

References

 

Santa Marta antbird
Birds of the Sierra Nevada de Santa Marta
Endemic birds of Colombia
Near threatened animals
Near threatened biota of South America
Santa Marta antbird
Santa Marta antbird